Mirabel is a provincial electoral district in Quebec, Canada that elects members to the National Assembly of Quebec. It includes the municipalities of Mirabel,  Oka, Pointe-Calumet, Saint-Joseph-du-Lac, Sainte-Marthe-sur-le-Lac and Saint-Placide and the Mohawk community of Kanesatake.

It was created for the 2003 election from parts of Argenteuil and Deux-Montagnes.

In the change from the 2001 to the 2011 electoral map, its territory was unchanged. In the change from the 2011 to the 2017 electoral map the riding will lose the communities of Saint-Janvier and Saint-Antoine-des-Laurentides to the new riding of Les Plaines.

Members of the National Assembly

Election results

* Result compared to Action démocratique

References

External links
Information
 Elections Quebec

Election results
 Election results (National Assembly)
 Election results (QuébecPolitique)

Maps
 2011 map (PDF)
 2001 map (Flash)
2001–2011 changes (Flash)
1992–2001 changes to Argenteuil (Flash)
1992–2001 changes to Deux-Montagnes (Flash)
 Electoral map of Laurentides region
 Quebec electoral map, 2011

Mirabel
Mirabel, Quebec